Surfliner may refer to:

Pacific Surfliner
Surfliner (railcar)